Hiroshi Yamashita (born 1 January 1986) is a Japanese rugby union player.

References

External links
 Top League Profile, in Japanese
 Kobe Steelers Profile, in Japanese
 Player Statistics at itsrugby.co.uk

1986 births
Living people
Japanese rugby union players
Japan international rugby union players
People from Shijōnawate
Sportspeople from Osaka Prefecture
Rugby union props
Kobelco Kobe Steelers players
Chiefs (rugby union) players
Japanese expatriate rugby union players
Expatriate rugby union players in New Zealand
Japanese expatriate sportspeople in New Zealand
Sunwolves players